Gondang Dam is located on the Kali Gondang River, a sub-basin of the Bengawan Solo River, at the village of Gondang Lor, in Sugio, a sub-district of Lamongan, Indonesia. It was built in 1983–1987 and has a  surface area and is about 29 meters in depth.

Description
The main use of the dam is for irrigation and community water needs, especially in the dry season, but many tourists come there for relaxing and fishing now. There is a camp site, pedalos and a small zoo.

The manager of the dam is committed to implementing the programs of Sapta Pesona (Seven Charms).

References

Buildings and structures in East Java